Saleem Al-Nasri (born January 1, 1977, in Ibri) is an Omani sport shooter who competes in the double trap at the 2004 Summer Olympics.

At the 2004 Summer Olympics in Athens, Al-Nasri qualified as a lone shooter for the two-person Omani team in the men's double trap, after having accepted one of the wildcard entry invitations distributed by the International Shooting Sport Federation. Al-Nasri scored 125 hits out of 150 in the qualifying round, and ended in twenty-first place in a field of twenty-five shooters.

References

External links
 
ISSF Profile

1977 births
Living people
Omani male sport shooters
Olympic shooters of Oman
Shooters at the 2004 Summer Olympics
Shooters at the 2002 Asian Games
Shooters at the 2006 Asian Games
Shooters at the 2014 Asian Games
Asian Games competitors for Oman
People from Ad Dakhiliyah Governorate
21st-century Omani people